Percy Wilding Hartley was an English professional football manager who coached Belgian side Standard Liège in the 1920s and 1930s.

Hartley was baptised on 27 September 1895 in Halliwell, Bolton, Lancashire. He married a woman named Jessie Archer on 18 March 1919.

References

1895 births
Year of death missing
English football managers
Standard Liège managers
Sportspeople from Bolton